Elachista revinctella is a moth of the family Elachistidae. It is found in France, Italy, Austria, Hungary and Croatia.

Taxonomy
The species was treated as a synonym of Elachista adscitella, but was reinstated as a species by Parenti in 1992.

References

revinctella
Moths described in 1850
Moths of Europe